Jan Lodewyk Serfontein (born 15 April 1993) is a South African professional rugby union rugby player. He plays as a centre for French Top 14 side .

Career

Serfontein was a member of the South Africa under 20 team that won the 2012 IRB Junior World Championship. His performances in the tournament led to him being named 2012 IRB Junior Player of the Year. He was also included in the squad for the 2013 IRB Junior World Championship, but was later withdrawn to make him available for the senior national team.

Serfontein made his debut for the Springboks versus Italy on 8 June 2013 at Kings Park Stadium in Durban, playing from the bench as a replacement for Bryan Habana from the 71st minute.

Personal

Serfontein is the younger brother of lock Boela Serfontein.

Springbok statistics

Test match record 

Pld = Games Played, W = Games Won, D = Games Drawn, L = Games Lost, Try = Tries Scored, Con = Conversions, Pen = Penalties, DG = Drop Goals, Pts = Points Scored

International Tries

References

External links

itsrugby.co.uk profile
IRB profile 

1993 births
Living people
Rugby union players from Port Elizabeth
South African rugby union players
South Africa international rugby union players
Rugby union centres
Afrikaner people
Bulls (rugby union) players
Blue Bulls players
South Africa Under-20 international rugby union players
Alumni of Grey High School
Alumni of Grey College, Bloemfontein